Aedh mac Suibhne was a chief or king of Máenmaige.

In 581 the Annals of the Four Masters records the death of "Aedh mac Suibhne, toiseach Maonmuighe"/"Aedh, son of Suibhne, chief of Maenmagh". He was probably a ruler of the native dynasty, later termed the Uí Fiachrach Fionn, who were conquered by the Uí Maine in the 8th or 9th century. The territory later became the barony of Loughrea.

External links
 http://www.ucc.ie/celt/published/T100005A/

References

 Medieval Ireland: Territorial, Political and Economic Divisions, Paul MacCotter, Four Courts Press, 2008, pp. 140–141. 

6th-century Irish monarchs
People from County Galway